Scarred is a television program that debuted on MTV on April 10, 2007. On each episode of Scarred, several real-life risk-takers share the stories of how they were scarred or injured while attempting dangerous stunts on primarily skateboards, but occasionally on in-line skates, skis, snowboards, and bikes.

"Scar Stories"
The show features a segment called "Scar Stories", which broadcasts videos caught on the scene of individuals dramatically injuring themselves, the wound often leaving a scar, hence the show's name. Every episode contains five stories. One example is a man trying to perform a grind but failing and tearing open his scrotum. He is one of only two people whose scar could not be shown on the show. The other was somebody who was left with a scar on his gluteal cleft.

Season 1 Special
Season 1's 10 episodes were followed by an hour-long special called "Scarred: Worst of the Worst." On it, a countdown of the ten worst injuries, as voted by viewers of the show, were shown in the usual countdown fashion, ending with "the most fucked up clip of the season." Between videos, Jacoby gave his own quick lists on topics such as the worst screams, the weirdest ways people have described their pain, or objects that have been needed to repair the damage done to various people, such as screws, plates, and stitches. A quick montage of clips followed showing examples of the topic.

Season 2
Starting with the second and final season, they began to count down the five videos of the episode, then recapping before the episode ends with a video clip called "The Most F*cked Up Clip of the Day," which is number one on the list and usually the most stomach-turning clip of that episode. An example of such a clip is the one where a skateboarder tries grinding a rail only to slip, land his stomach on the bar, bounce off and land on his face. This ripped his small and large intestines in half and, luckily, only caused minor head injuries. Despite the serious damage to his abdomen, one surgery was all he needed, and he made a full recovery.

Hosts
The show was hosted by the Papa Roach front man Jacoby Shaddix. "Alive ('N Out of Control)" by Papa Roach is the theme song for the show. Due to Papa Roach's touring, the show stopped after 20 episodes. There were no announcements about the show's cancellation.

Andy Samberg, the star of the film Hot Rod, also hosted a special Hot Rod edition to promote the film. He was included in three out of the shows five stunts.

Notable guests
Occasionally, a celebrity is featured with his own story to tell. These include Steve-O, Tony Hawk, Jason Acuña, Andy Sandberg, Morgan Wade, Kenny Hughes, and Brian Deegan. Coincidentally, Deegan's story was about an injury he'd received while appearing on another MTV show, Viva La Bam. His accident earned him the Most F*cked Up Clip of the Day.

Disclaimer
Scarred, like many shows in the same genre such as Jackass or Wildboyz, provides a warning to audiences that they should not attempt the stunts or send in home videos.  However, critics say that the viewers will overlook these warnings, since the show itself is a compilation of home videos of severe accidents and injuries.

The full disclaimer of the show:

Episodes

Season 1 (2007)

Season 2 (2007)

References

External links
 

2000s American reality television series
2007 American television series debuts
2007 American television series endings
English-language television shows
MTV original programming
Skateboarding mass media